Goraždevac is a village near the city of Peja in Kosovo. It has been inhabited since at least the thirteenth century, when it was mentioned in the chrysobull of Stefan Nemanja (or his son, Stefan the First-Crowned).

History
During World War II, 47 Serbs and Montenegrins were killed in the village in 1941 by Albanian paramilitaries. As a Serb-inhabited enclave in a heavily Albanian-inhabited region of western Kosovo, Goraždevac has been the scene of ethnic tensions between the two communities. It was the scene of attacks by the guerilla group, the Kosovo Liberation Army, in the late 1990s as they fought the Serb military forces, accused of committing atrocities against the Albanian population. After the end of the Kosovo War in June 1999, many of its population of around 2,000 Serbs fled attacks by Albanian militants, though some later returned. The population today is said to be around 850 people.

In June 2003, Veselin Besović from Goraždevac was sentenced by an international court in Peć to serve seven years in prison for crimes allegedly committed in the villages of Čuska and Zahać. He has appealed.

According to the 2011 census in Kosovo, the village had 570 people, of whom 255 were Serbs (44.7%), 148 were Albanians (25.9%), 139 Roma and Egyptians (24.4%), 26 Bosniaks (4.6%) and 2 others. The census was partially boycotted by the Serb population.

2003 Goraždevac murders

The village has come under repeated attack by Albanian extremists since the end of the Kosovo War and is one of a number of Kosovo Serb enclaves under 24-hour guard by troops from KFOR. In August 2003, a 19-year-old Serbian teenager and a 12-year-old boy were killed, with four more children wounded, with fire from automatic rifles, while swimming in the Bistrica river near Goraždevac. The attack occurred just before 200 Kosovo Serb refugees were to return to their homes, and the return was quickly aborted following the incident. It was widely blamed on Albanian extremists but the culprits have not yet been found.

See also
 Kosovo Serbian enclaves

Notes

Notelist

References

Villages in Peja
Serbian enclaves in Kosovo